Woodlynne is a borough in Camden County, in the U.S. state of New Jersey. As of the 2020 United States census, the borough's population was 2,902, a decrease of 76 (−2.6%) from the 2010 census count of 2,978, which in turn reflected an increase of 182 (+6.5%) from the 2,796 counted in the 2000 census. The borough is the state's eighth-smallest municipality. Established on the site of a defunct amusement park, Woodlynne is less than one-third the size of Six Flags Great Adventure and Safari.

Woodlynne was incorporated as a borough by an act of the New Jersey Legislature on March 19, 1901, from portions of Haddon Township. In 1906, the City of Camden made an unsuccessful attempt to annex Woodlynne.

Woodlynne had the highest property tax rate in New Jersey, with an equalized rate of 7.384% in 2020, compared to a statewide average of 2.279% and 3.470% in Camden County.

History
First settled by Europeans in 1681, a property owned by Mark Newbie was called Lynnewood, named for the linden trees in the area. The name was changed from Lynnewood to Woodlynne in 1892, due to conflicts with the name of another municipality.

Woodlynne Amusement Park, which encompassed Woodlynne Lake (no longer in existence), operated between the years 1895 and 1914 in the area that now comprises the town of Woodlynne. The New Camden Land Improvement Company commissioned the creation of Woodlynne Amusement Park on the estate of Charles M. Cooper in 1892.  Homes built over the old lake tend to flood in the basements during heavy rainstorms.

The Camden and Suburban Railway Company, formed in 1896, established a housing development in a section of Woodlynne Amusement Park, which contributed to its incorporation as Woodlynne Borough in 1901.

Geography

According to the United States Census Bureau, the borough had a total area of 0.23 square miles (0.58 km2), including 0.22 square miles (0.56 km2) of land and 0.01 square miles (0.02 km2) of water (3.04%).

Woodlynne borders the Borough of Collingswood and the City of Camden.

Climate
The climate in this area is characterized by hot, humid summers and generally mild to cool winters.   According to the Köppen Climate Classification system, Woodlynne has a humid subtropical climate, abbreviated "Cfa" on climate maps.

Demographics

2010 census

The Census Bureau's 2006–2010 American Community Survey showed that (in 2010 inflation-adjusted dollars) median household income was $41,516 (with a margin of error of +/− $6,233) and the median family income was $45,313 (+/− $17,965). Males had a median income of $39,020 (+/− $7,398) versus $32,688 (+/− $8,474) for females. The per capita income for the borough was $18,210 (+/− $2,557). About 14.8% of families and 14.2% of the population were below the poverty line, including 20.9% of those under age 18 and none of those age 65 or over.

2000 census
As of the 2000 United States census there were 2,796 people, 912 households, and 684 families residing in the borough. The racial makeup of the borough was 48.43% White, 22.71% African American, 0.57% Native American, 12.27% Asian, 11.59% from other races, and 4.43% from two or more races. Hispanic or Latino of any race were 20.60% of the population.

There were 912 households, out of which 42.4% had children under the age of 18 living with them, 42.1% were married couples living together, 25.0% had a female householder with no husband present, and 25.0% were non-families. 20.7% of all households were made up of individuals, and 7.5% had someone living alone who was 65 years of age or older. The average household size was 3.07 and the average family size was 3.52.

In the borough the population was spread out, with 32.4% under the age of 18, 8.7% from 18 to 24, 31.3% from 25 to 44, 18.8% from 45 to 64, and 8.7% who were 65 years of age or older. The median age was 31 years. For every 100 females, there were 95.0 males. For every 100 females age 18 and over, there were 85.6 males.

The median income for a household in the borough was $39,138, and the median income for a family was $39,669. Males had a median income of $33,520 versus $26,885 for females. The per capita income for the borough was $14,757. About 11.7% of families and 13.9% of the population were below the poverty line, including 21.5% of those under age 18 and 6.2% of those age 65 or over.

Government

Local government
Woodlynne is governed under the Borough form of New Jersey municipal government, which is used in 218 municipalities (of the 564) statewide, making it the most common form of government in New Jersey. The governing body is comprised of a Mayor and a Borough Council, with all positions elected at-large on a partisan basis as part of the November general election. A Mayor is elected directly by the voters to a four-year term of office. The Borough Council is comprised of six members elected to serve three-year terms on a staggered basis, with two seats coming up for election each year in a three-year cycle. The Borough form of government used by Woodlynne is a "weak mayor / strong council" government in which council members act as the legislative body with the mayor presiding at meetings and voting only in the event of a tie. The mayor can veto ordinances subject to an override by a two-thirds majority vote of the council. The mayor makes committee and liaison assignments for council members, and most appointments are made by the mayor with the advice and consent of the council.

, the Mayor of Woodlynne Borough is Democrat Joseph Chukwueke, whose term of office ends December 31, 2023. Members of the Woodlynne Borough Council are Council President Sharon Earley (D, 2024), Lavar Edwards (D, 2023), Shana K. Feliciano (D, 2022), Edwin Fontanez (D, 2022), Pablo Fuentes (D, 2023) and Wilfredo Rodriguez (D, 2024).

After a four-year period in which police officers from Collingswood patrolled the borough's streets, Woodlynne re-established its police department in September 2010.

Federal, state and county representation
Woodlynne is located in the 1st Congressional District and is part of New Jersey's 5th state legislative district.

Politics
As of March 2011, there were a total of 1,553 registered voters in Woodlynne, of which 661 (42.6%) were registered as Democrats, 85 (5.5%) were registered as Republicans and 804 (51.8%) were registered as Unaffiliated. There were 3 voters registered as Libertarians or Greens.

In the 2012 presidential election, Democrat Barack Obama received 86.8% of the vote (826 cast), ahead of Republican Mitt Romney with 12.6% (120 votes), and other candidates with 0.6% (6 votes), among the 959 ballots cast by the borough's 1,714 registered voters (7 ballots were spoiled), for a turnout of 56.0%. In the 2008 presidential election, Democrat Barack Obama received 79.4% of the vote (786 cast), ahead of Republican John McCain, who received around 16.6% (164 votes), with 990 ballots cast among the borough's 1,531 registered voters, for a turnout of 64.7%. In the 2004 presidential election, Democrat John Kerry received 71.5% of the vote (639 ballots cast), outpolling Republican George W. Bush, who received around 27.2% (243 votes), with 894 ballots cast among the borough's 1,465 registered voters, for a turnout percentage of 61.0.

In the 2013 gubernatorial election, Democrat Barbara Buono received 62.8% of the vote (240 cast), ahead of Republican Chris Christie with 36.6% (140 votes), and other candidates with 0.5% (2 votes), among the 394 ballots cast by the borough's 1,697 registered voters (12 ballots were spoiled), for a turnout of 23.2%. In the 2009 gubernatorial election, Democrat Jon Corzine received 68.1% of the vote (305 ballots cast), ahead of both Republican Chris Christie with 23.4% (105 votes) and Independent Chris Daggett with 3.1% (14 votes), with 448 ballots cast among the borough's 1,530 registered voters, yielding a 29.3% turnout.

Education
The Woodlynne School District serves public school students in pre-kindergarten through eighth grade at Woodlynne Elementary School. As of the 2019–20 school year, the district, comprised of one school, had an enrollment of 403 students and 33.1 classroom teachers (on an FTE basis), for a student–teacher ratio of 12.2:1.

Students in public school for ninth through twelfth grades attend Collingswood High School in neighboring Collingswood as part of a sending/receiving relationship with the Collingswood Public Schools, together with students from Oaklyn, New Jersey. As of the 2019–20 school year, the high school had an enrollment of 718 students and 64.5 classroom teachers (on an FTE basis), for a student–teacher ratio of 11.1:1.

Transportation

Roads and highways

New Jersey Route 168 and U.S. Route 130 are the main highways serving Woodlynne. Route 168 skims the western border of Woodlynne, while US 130 brushes the eastern edge of the borough.

Public transportation
The Ferry Avenue station, located in Woodlynne and Camden, provides PATCO Speedline service between the 15–16th & Locust station in Philadelphia and the Lindenwold station.

NJ Transit bus service is available on routes 400 (between Sicklerville and Philadelphia), 403 (between Turnersville and Camden via Lindenwold PATCO station), 450 (between Cherry Hill and Camden via Audubon) and 453 (between Ferry Avenue PATCO station and Camden).

Points of interest
 The Woodlynne war memorial, commemorating residents of Woodlynne who lost their lives in World War I, World War II, the Korean War, and the Vietnam War, is located on Woodlynne Avenue.

References

External links

 
 Woodlynne School District
 
 School Data for the Woodlynne School District, National Center for Education Statistics

 
1901 establishments in New Jersey
Borough form of New Jersey government
Boroughs in Camden County, New Jersey
Populated places established in 1901